is a funicular station in Ikoma, Nara Prefecture, Japan.

Lines 
Kintetsu
 ■ Kintetsu Ikoma Cable Line (Y20)

Adjacent stations 

Railway stations in Japan opened in 1929
Railway stations in Nara Prefecture